The 2007 Nigerian Senate election in Cross River State was held on 21 April 2007, to elect members of the Nigerian Senate to represent Cross River State. Victor Ndoma-Egba representing Cross River Central, Bassey Ewa-Henshaw representing Cross River South and Gregory Ngaji representing Cross River North all won on the platform of the People's Democratic Party.

Overview

Summary

Results

Cross River Central 
The election was won by Victor Ndoma-Egba of the Peoples Democratic Party (Nigeria).

Cross River South 
The election was won by Bassey Ewa-Henshaw of the Peoples Democratic Party (Nigeria).

Cross River North
The election was won by Gregory Ngaji of the Peoples Democratic Party (Nigeria).

References 

April 2007 events in Nigeria
Cross River State Senate elections
Cross